Thomas O'Carroll was a 14th-century Roman Catholic priest in Ireland.

MacCearbhaill was Archdeacon of Cashel until 1365 when he became Archbishop of Tuam. In 1365 Pope Urban V translated him to Cashel. He died on 8 February 1373.

References

14th-century Irish Roman Catholic priests
Archdeacons of Cashel
Archbishops of Tuam
Archbishops of Cashel
1373 deaths
Year of birth unknown